Agrupación Balonmano Gijón Jovellanos is a handball team based in Gijón, Asturias. Gijón Jovellanos plays in Liga ASOBAL.

History
Gijón Jovellanos was founded in 2009 with the aim to be the main handball club in the city grouping the players of the top farm teams in the city.

In its two first seasons competed in Primera Estatal, the third tier, promoting to División de Plata in 2011.

In the 2011–12 season, Gijón Jovellanos qualified for the promotion playoffs to Liga ASOBAL, played in Cangas do Morrazo, but failed in the semifinals against CB Cangas. This promotion was achieved in the next season on 13 April 2013, after beating CB Puente Genil in Gijón by 25–22. Finally, Gijón Jovellanos qualified in second position behind FC Barcelona B.

For playing in Liga ASOBAL, the club moved from Pabellón de La Arena to the Palacio de Deportes. In the first season in the Spanish top league, the Gijón Jovellanos finished in the 12th position and reached the quarterfinals of the 2013–14 Copa del Rey.

On April 1, 2015, despite being in the bottom of the 2014–15 Liga ASOBAL table, Gijón Jovellanos qualified for the 2014–15 Copa del Rey Final Four.

Two years later, in a disastrous season, Gijón Jovellanos was relegated to the third tier.

Arenas
Pabellón del Natahoyo 2009–2010
Pabellón de La Arena 2010–2013
Palacio de Deportes 2013–present

Sponsorship naming
Medicentro Gijón 2009–2011
Juanfersa Gijón 2012–2013
Juanfersa Grupo Fegar 2013–2014
Juanfersa Gijón 2014–2015
Juanfersa Comunicalia 2015–2016
Procoaf Gijón 2017–2019
DKV Gijón 2019–present

Head coaches
Alberto Suárez 2009–2015
Sergio Cotelo 2015–

Retired numbers
11 David Pellitero

Season by season

2 seasons in Liga ASOBAL

External links

References

Sport in Gijón
Spanish handball clubs
Liga ASOBAL teams
Handball clubs established in 2009
2009 establishments in Spain
Sports teams in Asturias